The Central Europe Rally was a rally raid endurance race held in Romania and Hungary, and served as the relocated 2008 edition of the Dakar Rally, the 30th running of the event.

The Amaury Sport Organisation created this event as the relocated Dakar Rally for 2008 after 2007 killing of French tourists in Mauritania (the event is owned by a French organisation) less than two weeks before the originally scheduled start of the race, and the decisions of organisers to defer all Dakar entrants to this event technically made this part of the Dakar.

Route
The event began in Budapest on April 19 and finished at Lake Balaton in Hungary on April 26, 2008.

Below is a table with the locations of the start and finish points of each stage of the Rally, as well as each stage's distance.

Results

Motorcycles
1. David Casteu (KTM) 12:21:14
2. Francisco López (KTM) +2:58
3. Alain Duclos (KTM) +19:39
4. José Manuel Pellicer (Yamaha) +21:20
5. Cyril Despres (KTM) +22:50

Cars
1. Carlos Sainz/Michel Périn, Volkswagen Race Touareg 2, 11h18m08s
2. Stéphane Peterhansel/Jean-Paul Cottret, Mitsubishi Pajero Evolution, + 2.01m
3. Dieter Depping/Timo Gottschalk, Volkswagen Race Touareg 2,  + 6.34m
4. Luc Alphand/Gilles Picard, Mitsubishi Pajero Evolution, + 7.28m
5. Carlos Sousa/Andreas Schulz, Volkswagen Race Touareg 2, + 33.45m
6. Bruno Saby/Alain Guehennec, BMW X3 CC, + 46.30m
7. Robert Baldwin/Kevin Heath, Hummer H3, + 56.02m
8. Philippe Gache/François Flick, SMG, + 1h07m08s
9. Miroslav Zapletal/Valdimir Nemajer, Mitsubishi L200, + 1h12m19s
10. Robby Gordon/Andy Grider, Hummer H3, + 1h25m38s

Trucks
1. Hans Stacey, Eddy Chevaillier, Bernard der Kinderen, MAN TGA, 11:43:20
2. Wulfer van Ginkel, Daniël Bruinsma, Richard de Rooy, GINAF X2222, +0:33:43
3. Aleš Loprais, Ladislav Lála, Milan Holáň, Tatra T815-2, +0:53:18
4. Marek Spáčil, Jiří Žák, Zdeněk Němec, LIAZ 151154, +1:27:42
5. Marco Dono, Andrea Bettiga, Angelo Fumagalli, Iveco, +1:28:27

References

Rally raid races
Central
Central